Velanadu is a region in the Indian state of Andhra Pradesh. It comprises the east coastal areas of the state lying between the Krishna and Penna rivers. Tenali and Repalle mandals of Guntur district are the most notable areas under this region.

References 

Sub regions of Andhra Pradesh
Coastal Andhra
Geography of Guntur district
Geography of Prakasam district